Öveç is a village in the Şemdinli District in Hakkâri Province in Turkey. The village is populated by Kurds of the Humaru tribe and had a population of 494 in 2021.

Öveç has the two hamlets of Harmanlı and Karaağaç attached to it.

History 
It was populated by 40 Assyrian families in 1877.

Population 
Population history of the village from 2000 to 2022:

References 

Villages in Şemdinli District
Kurdish settlements in Hakkâri Province
Historic Assyrian communities in Turkey